Gyani Ram was the first representative of the Indian National Congress who was elected to the Bihar Legislative Assembly in 1962 from Hazaribagh constituency.

References

Year of birth missing
Possibly living people
Indian National Congress politicians
People from Hazaribagh
Bihar MLAs 1962–1967